Murrey Mizell "Buddy" Harman, Jr. (December 23, 1928 – August 21, 2008) was an American country music session musician.

Career
Born in Nashville, Tennessee, Harman played drums on over 18,000 sessions for artists such as Elvis Presley, Jerry Lee Lewis, Moon Mullican, Songwriter Larry Petree, Martha Carson, Dolly Parton, Brenda Lee, Tammy Wynette, Loretta Lynn, Roy Orbison, Connie Francis, Chet Atkins, Marty Robbins, Ray Price, Roger Miller, Johnny Cash, Willie Nelson, Waylon Jennings, George Jones, Kenny Rogers, Barbara Mandrell, Eddy Arnold, Perry Como, Merle Haggard, Reba McEntire, Gillian Welch and many more.

With Patsy Cline

Harman appeared on almost all of Cline's Decca sessions from her first in November 1960 to her last in February 1962, during which time he backed her on songs such as:

Crazy
She's Got You
Foolin' Around
Seven Lonely Days
You Belong to Me
Heartaches
True Love
Faded Love
Someday (You'll Want Me to Want You)
Sweet Dreams
Crazy Arms
 San Antonio Rose
 The Wayward Wind
 A Poor Man's Roses (Or a Rich Man's Gold)
 Have You Ever Been Lonely (Have You Ever Been Blue)?
 South of the Border (Down Mexico Way)
 Walkin' After Midnight (1961 recording)
 You Made Me Love You (I Didn't Want To Do It)
 Your Cheatin' Heart
 That's My Desire
 Half As Much
 I Can't Help It (If I'm Still in Love with You)
 Leavin' On Your Mind
 Someday (You'll Want Me To Want You)
 Love Letters In The Sand
 Blue Moon of Kentucky
and more.

Awards 
Harman was the first regular drummer on the Grand Ole Opry. Some of Harman's awards include "Drummer of the Year" in 1981 from the Academy of Country Music and "Super Picker" Award for drums on the most No. 1 recordings from the Nashville NARAS chapter in 1975 and 1976.

Death 
Harman died at the Hospice Center in Nashville from congestive heart failure at the age of 79.

Selected discography

Singles

Albums

With Kai Winding
Modern Country (Verve, 1964)

See also
 The Nashville A-Team

References

External links
  Bob Moore’s Nashville A-Team website
Buddy Harman Interview - NAMM Oral History Library (2003)
Buddy Harman Jr. Interview - NAMM Oral History Library (2009)
Murray Harman Interview - NAMM Oral History Library (2009)
 Buddy Harman recordings at the Discography of American Historical Recordings.

1928 births
2008 deaths
Musicians from Nashville, Tennessee
American session musicians
American country drummers
20th-century American drummers
American male drummers
Country musicians from Tennessee
20th-century American male musicians